Georg Henri Anton "Joris" Ivens (18 November 1898 – 28 June 1989) was a Dutch documentary filmmaker. Among the notable films he directed or co-directed are A Tale of the Wind, The Spanish Earth, Rain, ...A Valparaiso, Misère au Borinage (Borinage), 17th Parallel: Vietnam in War, The Seine Meets Paris, Far from Vietnam, Pour le Mistral and How Yukong Moved the Mountains.

Early life and career
Born Georg Henri Anton Ivens into a wealthy family, Ivens went to work in one of his father's photo supply shops and from there developed an interest in film. Under the direction of his father, he completed his first film at 13; in college he studied economics with the goal of continuing his father's business, but an interest in class issues distracted him from that path. He met photographer Germaine Krull in Berlin in 1923, and entered into a marriage of convenience with her between 1927 and 1943 so that Krull could hold a Dutch passport and could have a "veneer of married respectability without sacrificing her autonomy."

Originally his work focused on technique, especially in Rain (Regen, 1929), a 10-minute short filmed over 2 years, and in The Bridge (De Brug, 1928). Around this time, along with Menno ter Braak and others, he was involved in the creation of the Dutch Film League (De Nederlandsche Filmliga) based in Amsterdam. The League drew foreign filmmakers to the Netherlands such as Alberto Cavalcanti, René Clair, Sergei Eisenstein, Vsevolod Pudovkin, and Dziga Vertov, who also became his friends.

In 1929, Ivens went to the Soviet Union and was invited to direct a film on a topic of his own choosing which was the new industrial city of Magnitogorsk. Before commencing work, he returned to the Netherlands to make Industrial Symphony for Philips Electric which is considered to be a film of great technical beauty. He returned to the Soviet Union to make the film about Magnitogorsk, Song of Heroes  in 1931 with music composed by Hanns Eisler. This was the first film on which Ivens and Eisler worked together. It was a propaganda film about this new industrial city where masses of laborers and communist youth worked for Stalin's Five Year Plan.
With Henri Storck, Ivens made Misère au Borinage (Borinage, 1933), a documentary on life in a coal mining region. In 1943, he also directed two Allied propaganda films for the National Film Board of Canada, including Action Stations, about the Royal Canadian Navy's escorting of convoys in the Battle of the Atlantic.

U.S. and World War II-era career
From 1936 to 1945, Ivens was based in the United States. For Pare Lorentz's U.S. Film Service, in the year 1940, he made a documentary film on rural electrification called Power and the Land. It focused on a family, the Parkinsons, who ran a business providing milk for their community. The film showed the problem in the lack of electricity and the way the problem was fixed. Ivens was, however, known for his anti-fascist and other propaganda films, including The Spanish Earth, for the Spanish Republicans, co-written with Ernest Hemingway and music by Marc Blitzstein and Virgil Thomson. Jean Renoir did the French narration for the film and Hemingway did the English version only after Orson Welles' sounded too theatrical.. This film was financed by Archibald MacLeish, Fredric March, Florence Eldridge, Lillian Hellman, Luise Rainer, Dudley Nichols, Franchot Tone and other Hollywood movie stars, moguls, and writers who composed a group known as the Contemporary Historians.  Spanish Earth  was shown at the White House on July 8, 1937 after Ivens, Hemingway, Martha Gellhorn, had had dinner with President Franklin D. Roosevelt, Eleanor Roosevelt and Harry Hopkins. The Roosevelts loved the film but said that it needed more propaganda. This 1937 documentary was considered his masterpiece.

In 1938 he traveled to China. The 400 Million (1939) depicted the history of modern China and the Chinese resistance during the Second Sino-Japanese War, including dramatic shots of the Battle of Taierzhuang. Robert Capa did camerawork, Sidney Lumet worked on the film as a reader, Hanns Eisler wrote the musical score, and Fredric March provided the narration. It, too, had been financed by the same people as those of Spanish Earth. Its chief fundraiser was Luise Rainer, recipient of the best actress Oscar two years in a row; and the entire group called themselves this time, History Today, Inc . The Kuomintang government censored the film, fearing that it would give too much credit to left-wing forces. Ivens was also suspected of being a friend of Mao Zedong and especially Zhou Enlai.

In early 1943, Frank Capra hired Ivens to supervise the production of Know Your Enemy: Japan  for his U.S. War Department film series Why We Fight. The film's commentary was written largely by Carl Foreman. Capra fired Ivens from the project because he felt that his approach was too sympathetic toward the Japanese. The film's release was held up because there were concerns that Emperor Hirohito was being depicted as a war criminal, and there was a policy shift to portray the Emperor more favorably after the war as a means of maintaining order in post-war Japan.

With the emerging "Red Scare" of the late 1940s, Ivens was forced to leave the country in the early months of the Truman administration. Ivens' leftist politics also put a stop to his first feature film project which was to have starred Greta Garbo. In fact, Walter Wanger, the film's producer, was adamant about "running [Ivens] out of town."

Return to Europe 

In 1946, commissioned to make a Dutch film about Indonesian 'independence', Ivens resigned in protest over what he considered ongoing imperialism; the Dutch were in his view resisting decolonization. Instead, Ivens filmed Indonesia Calling in secret, for which he received funding from the International Workers Order. For around a decade Ivens lived in Eastern Europe, working for several studios there. His position concerning Indonesia and his taking sides for the Eastern Bloc in the Cold War annoyed the Dutch government. Over a period of many years, he was obliged to renew his passport every three or four months. According to later mythology however, he lost his passport for ten years, which is not true, as demonstrated by the fact that he was able to travel to New York City to sit by the bedside of his old friend Paul Robeson when he was ill.

From 1965 to 1970 he worked on two documentary films about North Vietnam during the war: he made 17e parallèle: La guerre du peuple (17th Parallel: Vietnam in War) and he participated in the collective work Loin du Vietnam (Far from Vietnam). He was awarded the Lenin Peace Prize for the year 1967.

From 1971 to 1977, he shot How Yukong Moved the Mountains, a 763-minute documentary about the Cultural Revolution in China. He was given unprecedented access because of his pro-communist views and his old personal friendships with Zhou Enlai and Mao Zedong.

He spoke to Radio Netherlands about his life and work in a wide-ranging interview.

In 1988 Ivens received the Golden Lion Honorary Award at the Venice Film Festival. He then received the Order of the Netherlands Lion in January 1989, and died on 28 June that year. Shortly before his death he released the last of more than 40 films Une histoire de vent (A Tale of the Wind). A statue of Ivens by sculptor Bryan McCormack was erected in the Parc de Saint-Cloud in Paris in 2010.

Filmography

The Flaming Arrow (1912)
O, Sunland (1922)
The Sunhouse (1925)
Film Sketchbook (1927)
The Sick Town (1927)
Instruction Films Micro Camera, University Leiden (1927)
Movement Studies in Paris (1927)
Filmstudy Zeedijk (1927)
The Street (1927)
Ice Skating (1927)
The Bridge (1928)
Rain (1929)
Breakers (1929)
Poor Drenthe (The Misery in the Peat-mores of Drenthe) (1929)
Pile Diving (1929)
Zonneland (1930)
We are building (1930)
Second Union Film (1930)
Zuiderzee (1930)
Tribune Film (1930)
Concrete Construction (1930)
Donogoo-Tonka (1931)
Philips Radio (1931)
Creosote (1932)
Komsomol, (Song of Heroes, Youth Speaks) (1932)
New Earth (1933)
Borinage (1934)
The Spanish Earth (1937)
The 400 Million (1938)
New Frontiers (1940)
Power and the Land (1940)
Our Russian Front (1942)
Action Stations (1943)
Corvette Port Arthur (1943)
Know Your Enemy: Japan (1945) (uncredited)
Indonesia Calling (1946)
The First Years (1948)
Friendship Triumphs (1952)
Peace Tour 1952 (1952)
Chagall (article in Italian) (1952-1960)
The Song of the Rivers (1954)
My Child (1956)
The Windrose / Rose of the Winds (1957)
The war of the 600 Million People (1958)
Letters from China (1958)
L'Italia non è un paese povero (article in Italian) (1960)
Demain à Nanguila (1960)
Carnet de viaje (1961)
Pueblo en armas (1961)
Le petit chapiteau (1963)
Le train de la victoire (1964)
...A Valparaiso (article in French) (1965)
Le mistral (1965)
Rotterdam Europoort (1966)
Le ciel - La terre (1967)
Far from Vietnam (1967)
Une histoire de ballon (1967)
17th Parallel: Vietnam in War (1968)
Le people et ses fusills (1970)
How Yukong Moved the Mountains (1976)
Les ouigours (1977)
Les Kazaks (1977)
The Drugstore (1980)
A Tale of the Wind (1988)

References

Further reading
A. Zalzman, Joris Ivens, Seghers, Paris, 1963.
Joris Ivens, The Camera and I, International Publishers, New York, 1969.
Rosalind Delmar, Joris Ivens: 50 Years of Film-Making, Educational Advisory Service, British Film Institute, London, 1979. 
Carlos Böker, Joris Ivens, Film-Maker: Facing Reality, UMI Research Press, Ann Arbor, Michigan, 1981. 
Joris Ivens and China, New World Press, Beijing, 1983. 
Kees Bakker (ed.), Joris Ivens and the Documentary Context, paperback edition, Amsterdam University Press, Amsterdam, 2000. 

Hans Schoots, Living Dangerously: A Biography of Joris Ivens, Amsterdam University Press, Amsterdam, 2000. 
Virgilio Tosi, Joris Ivens: Cinema e Utopia, Bulzoni, Rome, 2002.

External links

European Foundation Joris Ivens
Biographer Hans Schoots on Ivens

1898 births
1989 deaths
People from Nijmegen
Burials at Montparnasse Cemetery
Dutch communists
Dutch documentary filmmakers
Dutch film directors
Knights of the Order of the Netherlands Lion
Lenin Peace Prize recipients
Propaganda film directors
Expatriates in East Germany